Patrick Joseph "Pat" Morrissey (23 February 1948 – 19 February 2005) was an Irish professional association footballer, who played as a striker.

Morrissey was born in Enniscorthy, County Wexford, but moved to England as a young child, and played schoolboy football at county level. In a career spanning 25 years, Morrissey played for Coventry City, Torquay United, Crewe Alexandra, Chester, Watford, Aldershot (who signed him in exchange for Roger Joslyn), Swansea City, Dartford, Hayes, Slough Town, Carshalton Athletic, Hendon, Chesham United, Dunstable Town and Southall. He also played for the Republic of Ireland national under-23 football team.

Morrissey's first managerial role was as a player manager at Chesham United. He fulfilled the same roles at Dunstable Town and Southall, and also managed Buckingham Town and Colney Heath. He died in 2005. He had two sons, both of whom have played for Colney Heath.

References

Republic of Ireland under-23 international footballers
Coventry City F.C. players
Torquay United F.C. players
Crewe Alexandra F.C. players
Chester City F.C. players
Watford F.C. players
Aldershot F.C. players
Swansea City A.F.C. players
Dartford F.C. players
Hayes F.C. players
Slough Town F.C. players
Carshalton Athletic F.C. players
Hendon F.C. players
Chesham United F.C. players
Dunstable Town F.C. players
English Football League players
Southall F.C. players
Chesham United F.C. managers
Dunstable Town F.C. managers
Southall F.C. managers
Buckingham Town F.C. managers
Colney Heath F.C. managers
1948 births
2005 deaths
People from Enniscorthy
Association footballers from County Wexford
Association football forwards
Republic of Ireland association footballers
Republic of Ireland expatriate association footballers
Expatriate footballers in England
Republic of Ireland football managers